Puran class of barge is a series of self-propelled fuel carrier built by Rajabagan Dockyard (RBD) (then owned by Central Inland Water Transport Corporation) for the Indian Navy.

Description

The vessel in the series has a length of 45–50 meters with a beam of 8 meters and a draught of 3 meters.
The vessels have displacement of 960 tonnes and have capacity to carry 376 tons of fuel.
The vessels are yardcrafts and have all of the essential communication and navigation equipment. 
These vessels have no underway replenishment capability. They are utilized for in-port refueling

Specification
Gross		: 413 Tonnes
Net		: 252 Tonnes
Dead Weight	: 434 Tonnes
Overall Length	: 45.55 m
Lbp		: 42.32 m
Brdth Ext	: 7.95 m
Brdth Mlt	: 7.93 m
Draught Max    : 2.972
Depth Mld	: 3.84 m
Ship Type	: TANKER OIL
No of Tanks	: 4TA
Capacities Liq	: 266 
Engine Design	: M. A. N.
Power		: 390 KW
Aux Gen	: 2X28 KW 415 V 50 Hz AC
Speed (Knots)	: 10

References

Auxiliary ships of the Indian Navy